The North–South Expressway West (Vietnamese: Đường cao tốc Bắc – Nam phía Tây) is a partially completed expressway in Vietnam that will form an inland parallel route to the North–South expressway. It will run from Đoan Hùng to Rạch Sỏi in the Mekong Delta, following a similar route to the historic Ho Chi Minh Highway. Between Hà Tĩnh and Da Nang, the narrowest part of Vietnam, it will be concurrent with the North–South Expressway.

History 

The section Cao Lãnh - Lộ Tẻ opened in May 2018 and includes two major cable-stayed bridges, Cao Lãnh bridge over the Tiền River, and Vàm Cống bridge over the Hậu River. These bridges replaced ferry services, also carrying lanes for slower traffic.

The section Lộ Tẻ - Rạch Sỏi was completed in January 2021, however only as a 2x2 lane trunk road, pending future upgrade to full expressway standard. The section  was constructed at a cost of VND 6,355 billion (US$270 million), partially financed by the Korean government through a development loan.

Status 
The North–South Expressway West (Vietnamese: Đường cao tốc Bắc – Nam phía Tây) is a partially completed expressway in Vietnam. When completed, it will form a road parallel to the North-South Expressway along with National Route 1 and Vietnam Coastal Road.
The expressway has a total length of about 1,205 km, divided into 16 sections, passing through 23 provinces and cities: Tuyên Quang, Phú Thọ, Hanoi, Hòa Bình, [[Thanh Hoa, Nghe An, Hà Tĩnh, Quang Binh, Quảng Trị, Thua Thien Hue, Đà Nẵng, Quang Nam, Kon Tum, Gia Lai, Dak Lak, Dak Nong, Binh Phuoc, Binh Duong, Tay Ninh, Long An, Dong Thap, Can Tho, Kien Giang. Most of the expressway is upgraded from Ho Chi Minh Highway phase 3. CT.02 also part of CT.01

List of Expressway segments 

 Note

References 

Road transport in Vietnam
Expressways in Vietnam